Sreshta Rit Premnath is an artist living in New York City whose work incorporates multiple media. He is the founding editor of Shifter, a platform that convenes public discussions and produces topical publications at the intersection of art and theory. He is faculty in the Fine Arts department at Parsons, New York.

Selected exhibitions
Grave/Grove Premnath's solo exhibition at Contemporary Art Center, Cincinnati. Curated by Amara Antilla and Natalie Bell in 2021, the exhibition contains object installations.

Grave/Grove Premnath's solo exhibition at MIT List Visual Arts Center, Cambridge. Curated by Amara Antilla and Natalie Bell in 2021, the exhibition contains object installations.

The Protest and the Recuperation exhibition at the Wallach Art Gallery, Columbia University, NYC. Curated by Betti-Sue Hertz, this group exhibition explores global artistic responses to mass protests as well as strategies of recuperation.

Those Who Wait Premnath's solo exhibition at Contemporary Art Gallery, Vancouver. Curated by Kimberly Phillips in 2019, the exhibition contains object installations and was accompanied by a monograph.

Cadere/Rose Premnath's solo exhibition at Nomas Foundation, in Rome Italy. Curated by Maria Rosa Sossai in 2017, the exhibition contains large monograph vinyl wall prints, object installations, and a video.

Folding Rulers at Contemporary Art Museum (CAM) St Louis, USA. This solo exhibition, curated by Kelly Schindler in 2012, is a full room installation with wall banners and objects visualizing representations of power.

After Midnight: Indian Modernism to Contemporary Art exhibition at the Queens Museum, NYC. Curated by Arshiya Lokhandwala, this group exhibition explores themes of art and nation-building in a newly globalized contemporary art world.

External links 
Frieze review of Sreshta Rit Premnath's exhibition at MIT List Visual Arts Center in Cambridge, USA

Sculpture Magazine review of Sreshta Rit Premnath's exhibition at MIT List Visual Arts Center in Cambridge, USA

ArtForum interview of Sreshta Rit Premnath's by Murtaza Vali

Bomb Magazine interview of Sreshta Rit Premnath's by Sohrab Mohebbi

ArtForum review of Sreshta Rit Premnath's exhibition at Kansas Gallery

e-flux conversations publication by Sreshta Rit Premnath entitled "Critique as Unlearning"

SHIFTER a topical publication, founded and co-edited by Sreshta Rit Premnath

References

Living people
1979 births